The  Gauhati High Court  was promulgated by governor general of India on 1 March 1948 after the Government of India Act 1935 was passed. Establishing the High Court of Assam with effect from 5 April 1948, for the then Province of Assam. It was originally known as the High Court of Assam and Nagaland, but renamed as Gauhati High Court in 1971 by the North-Eastern Areas (Reorganisation) Act, 1971.

It has largest jurisdiction in terms of states, with its area covering the states of Assam, Arunachal Pradesh, Nagaland, and Mizoram.

History
After Indian independence, the Assam Legislative Assembly adopted a resolution on 9 September 1947 that a High Court be established for the Province of Assam. In exercise of power conferred by the Government of India Act 1935, the Governor General of India on 1 March 1948 promulgated the Assam High Court Order, 1948, establishing the High Court of Assam. It was inaugurated on 5 April 1948 by H. J. Kania, the Chief Justice of India. Sir R.F. Lodge was sworn in as the first Chief Justice of the Assam High Court on the same day.  The Assam High Court initially had its sittings at Shillong but shifted to Guwahati on 14 August 1948.

Later, when Nagaland state was created on 1 December 1963, the Assam High Court was renamed as the High Court of Assam and Nagaland.

On re-organization of the northeastern region of India by the North-Eastern Areas (Reorganisation) Act, 1971, the High Court of Assam and Nagaland was abolished with effect from 21 January 1972 by section 28(1)(a) of the Act. The Courts of Judicial Commissioners for Manipur and Tripura, which were functioning as high courts, were also abolished by section 30(1) of the Act. In place of these three entities, a common high court for five states, named Gauhati High Court, was established by section 28(1)(b) of the Act. This High Court was given jurisdiction over the then union territories of Arunachal Pradesh and Mizoram by section 32 of the Act.

After Meghalaya, Manipur and Tripura got its High Court, the Gauhati High Court ceased its jurisdiction in these three states.

Principal Seat & Benches

The principal seat of the Gauhati High Court is at Guwahati in Assam. The court has 3 outlying benches. These are:
 The Kohima bench for Nagaland state (established on 1 December 1972)
 The Aizawl bench for Mizoram state (established on 5 July 1990) 
 The Itanagar bench for Arunachal Pradesh state (established on 12 August 2000)

Former benches, now full-fledged high courts:
 The Imphal bench (established on 21 January 1972) (Converted to a High Court in March 2013)
 The Agartala bench established on 24 January 1972) (Converted to a High Court in March 2013)
 The Shillong bench established on 4 September 1974)(Converted to a High Court in March 2013)

The Kohima Bench for Nagaland state

The Kohima Bench is located on the eastern slope of the Ministers’ Hill in the capital city of Nagaland, Kohima. The building where the Kohima Bench is, was earlier a Hostel which was renovated for the Kohima Bench. The inauguration of the Bench at the capital Kohima, was on 1 December 1972, by the Hon’ble Mr. Justice M.C.Pathak.

Permanent Judge for the State of Nagaland 
 Mr. Justice Lanusungkum Jamir (Portfolio Judge)
Elevated as Additional Judge on 22 May 2013.

The Itanagar bench for Arunachal Pradesh state

The Permanent Bench at Itanagar was inaugurated on 12 August 2000 by Hon'ble Chief Justice of the Supreme Court of India, Dr. A.S. Anand at Naharlagun which is located about 13 km. from the capital town, Itanagar.

Permanent Judge for the State of Arunachal Pradesh
 Pranoy Kumar Musahary (01/07/2008 - Till Date) retired now

The Aizawl bench for Mizoram state

The Aizawl Permanent Bench is situated at the capital city of Mizoram, Aizawl. On 5 July 1990, the Aizawl Permanent Bench of the Gauhati High Court was established and inaugurated by the then Chief Justice of India, Mr. Justice S.B.Mukherjee

Permanent Judge for the State of Mizoram
  Mr. Justice M. R. Pathak (Portfolio Judge)
Elevated as Additional Judge of the Gauhati High Court on 22 May 2013

  Mr. Justice Michael Zothankhuma (Station Judge)
Elevated as Additional Judge, Gauhati High Court on 7 January 2015

Judges from the High Court currently serving in the Supreme Court of India

Hon'ble Mr. Justice Hrishikesh Roy, (Former Judge, Gauhati)

Former Chief Justices

See also

High Courts of India

References

 Jurisdiction and Seats of Indian High Courts
Judge strength in High Courts increased

External links
 Gauhati High Court - Legal Directory
 High Court website

Guwahati
Government of Assam
1948 establishments in India
Courts and tribunals established in 1948